Andrew Wight (14 November 1959 – 4 February 2012) was an Australian screenwriter and producer best known for his  2011 film Sanctum.  He produced over 45 films including television documentaries, live television specials and 3D IMAX films. His credits include Ghosts of the Abyss, Aliens of the Deep and Expedition: Bismarck. Wight was honoured with the Australian Geographic Society Spirit of Adventure Awards in 1989.

Wight grew up on the family farm "Tarqua" near Harrow in western-Victoria, and attended Hamilton College as a boarder between 1972 and 1977. It was here that he developed a taste for caving, exploring the nearby Byaduk Caves network of lava caves, under the direction of his Chemistry teacher, accompanied by a few other close school friends. In 1988, he eventually went on to attempt a record cave dive in Pannikin Plains Cave on the Nullarbor Plain, where flash floods turned the expedition into a life-or-death adventure. This was captured on film by his support team, and eventually published as Nullarbor Dreaming. This short film launched his career as an international film-maker and culminated in him becoming James Cameron's right-hand man on many 3D and other film projects. Sanctum was inspired by his Nullarbor experience.

On 4 February 2012, Wight was killed in a helicopter crash at Jaspers Brush near the town of Berry, New South Wales. The crash also claimed the life of American filmmaker Mike deGruy.

See also
 Cave Divers Association of Australia

References

External links
 

1959 births
2012 deaths
Accidental deaths in New South Wales
Australian screenwriters
Australian film producers
Australian underwater divers
Aviators killed in aviation accidents or incidents in Australia
People from Victoria (Australia)
Victims of aviation accidents or incidents in 2012
Victims of helicopter accidents or incidents in Australia